Shechem, also spelled Sichem (Samaritan Hebrew:), was a Canaanite and Israelite city mentioned in the Amarna Letters, later appearing in the Hebrew Bible as the first capital of the Kingdom of Israel following the split of the United Monarchy. Shechem declined after the fall of the northern Kingdom of Israel. The city later regained its importance as a prominent Samaritan center during the Hellenistic period.

Traditionally associated with the city of Nablus, Shechem is now identified with the nearby site of Tell Balata in the Balata al-Balad suburb of the West Bank.

Geographical position

Shechem's position is indicated in the Hebrew Bible: it lay north of Bethel and Shiloh, on the high road going from Jerusalem to the northern districts (Judges xxi, 19), at a short distance from Michmethath (Joshua 17:7) and of Dothain (Genesis 37:12–17); it was in the hill-country of Ephraim (Joshua 20:7; 21:21; 1 Kings 12:25; 1 Chronicles 6:67; 7:28), immediately below Mount Gerizim (Judges 9:6–7). These indications are substantiated by Josephus, who says that the city lay between Mount Ebal and Mount Gerizim, and by the Madaba map, which places its Sykhem between one of its two sets of "Tour Gobel" (Ebal) and the "Tour Garizin" (Garizim). The site of Shechem in patristic sources is almost invariably identified with, or located close to, the town of Flavia Neapolis (Nablus).

History
Shechem was a very ancient commercial center due to its position in the middle of vital trade routes through the region. A very old "Way of the Patriarchs" trade route runs in the north–south direction.

Chalcolithic
The oldest settlement in Shechem goes back to about six thousand years ago, during the Chalcolithic period (4000–3500 BCE). At that time agriculture was already practiced.

Bronze Age
Subsequently, during the Early Bronze Age, activity seems to have moved to the nearby area of Khirbet Makhneh el-Fauqa. Some publications claim that Shechem is mentioned in the third-millennium Ebla tablets, but this has been denied by competent archaeologists.

The first substantial building activity at Shechem dates from the Middle Bronze Age IIA (c. 1900 BCE). It became a very substantial Canaanite settlement, and was attacked by Egypt, as mentioned in the Sebek-khu Stele, an Egyptian stele of a noble at the court of Senusret III (c. 1880–1840 BCE).

In the Amarna Letters of about 1350 BCE, Šakmu (i.e., Shechem) was the center of a kingdom carved out by Labaya (or Labayu), a Canaanite warlord who recruited mercenaries from among the Habiru. Labaya was the author of three Amarna letters (EA 252, EA 253, and EA 254), and his name appears in 11 of the other 382 letters, referred to 28 times, with the basic topic of the letter, being Labaya himself, and his relationship with the rebelling, countryside Habiru.

Shechem may be identical to the Sakama mentioned in an account dated to the Nineteenth Dynasty of Egypt (around 1200 BCE). (See Papyrus Anastasi I).

Classical antiquity

During the partial exile of the Kingdom of Judea by Nebuchadnezzar from 606 to 536 BCE, those Judeans who remained in Eretz Israel reestablished the altar at Shechem to keep the worship system of Judaism going when access to Jerusalem was cut off.

During the Hellenistic and Roman periods, Shechem was the main settlement of the Samaritans, whose religious center stood on Mount Gerizim, just outside the town. In 6 CE, Shechem was annexed to the Roman Province of Judea. Of the Samaritans of Sichem not a few rose up in arms on Mt. Gerizim at the time of the Galilean rebellion (67 CE), which was part of the First Jewish–Roman War. The city was very likely destroyed by Sextus Vettulenus Cerialis
, during that war.

In 72 CE, a new city, Flavia Neapolis, was built by Vespasian  to the west of the old one. This city's name was eventually corrupted to the modern Nablus. Josephus, writing in about 90 CE (Jewish Antiquities 4.8.44), placed the city between Mount Gerizim and Mount Ebal. Elsewhere he refers to it as Neapolis.

In Emperor Hadrian's reign, the temple on Mt. Gerizim was restored and dedicated to Jupiter.

Like Shechem, Neapolis had a very early Christian community, including the early saint Justin Martyr; we hear even of bishops of Neapolis. On several occasions the Christians suffered greatly at the hands of the Samaritans. In 474 the emperor, to avenge what Christians considered an unjust attack by the Samaritans, deprived the latter of Mt. Gerizim and gave it to the Christians, who built on it a church dedicated to the Blessed Virgin.

Later history

The city of Nablus was Islamicized in the Abbasid and Ottoman periods. In 1903 near Nablus, a German party of archaeologists led by Dr. Hermann Thiersch stumbled upon the site called Tell Balata and now identified as ancient Shechem. Nablus is still referred to as Shechem by Israeli Hebrew speakers, even though the original site of Shechem lies east of the modern-day city.

In the Bible

Hebrew Bible/Old Testament
Shechem first appears in the Hebrew Bible in Genesis 12:6–8, which says that Abraham reached the "great tree of Moreh" at Shechem and offered sacrifice nearby.  Genesis, Deuteronomy, Joshua and Judges hallow Shechem over all other cities of the land of Israel. According to Genesis (12:6–7) Abram "built an altar to the Lord who had appeared to him… and had given that land to his descendants" at Shechem. The Bible states that on this occasion, God confirmed the covenant he had first made with Abraham in Harran, regarding the possession of the land of Canaan. In Jewish tradition, the old name was understood in terms of the Hebrew word shékém – "shoulder, saddle", corresponding to the mountainous configuration of the place.

On a later sojourn, two sons of Jacob, Simeon and Levi, avenged their sister Dinah's rape by "Shechem the son of Hamor the Hivite, the prince of the land" of Shechem.  Shimon and Levi said to the Shechemites that, if "every male among you is circumcised, then we will give our daughters to you and take your daughters to ourselves." Once the Shechemites agree to the mass circumcision, however, Jacob's sons repay them by killing all of the city's male inhabitants.

Following the settlement of the Israelites in Canaan after their Exodus from Egypt, according to the biblical narrative, Joshua assembled the Israelites at Shechem and asked them to choose between serving the GOD of Abraham who had delivered them from Egypt, or the false gods which their ancestors had served on the other side of the Euphrates River, or the gods of the Amorites in whose land they now lived. The people chose to serve the GOD of the Bible, a decision which Joshua recorded in the Book of the Law of God, and he then erected a memorial stone "under the oak that was by the sanctuary of the Lord" in Shechem. The oak is associated with the Oak of Moreh where Abram had set up camp during his travels in this area.

Shechem and its surrounding lands were given as a Levitical city to the Kohathites.

Owing to its central position, no less than to the presence in the neighborhood of places hallowed by the memory of Abraham (Genesis 12:6, 7; 34:5), Jacob's Well (Genesis 33:18–19; 34:2, etc.), and Joseph's tomb (Joshua 24:32), the city was destined to play an important part in the history of Israel. Jerubbaal (Gideon), whose home was at Ophrah, visited Shechem, and his concubine who lived there was mother of his son Abimelech (Judges 8:31). She came from one of the leading Shechemite families who were influential with the "Lords of Shechem" (Judges 9:1–3, wording of the New Revised Standard Version and New American Bible Revised Edition).

After Gideon's death, Abimelech was made king (Judges 9:1–45). Jotham, the youngest son of Gideon, made an allegorical speech on Mount Gerizim in which he warned the people of Shechem about Abimelech's future tyranny (Judges 9:7–20). When the city rose in rebellion three years later, Abimelech took it, utterly destroyed it, and burnt the temple of Baal-berith where the people had fled for safety. The city was rebuilt in the 10th century BC and was probably the capital of Ephraim (1 Kings 4). Shechem was the place appointed, after Solomon's death, for the meeting of the people of Israel and the investiture of his son Rehoboam as king; the meeting ended in the secession of the ten northern tribes, and Shechem, fortified by Jeroboam, became the capital of the new kingdom (1 Kings 12:1; 14:17; 2 Chronicles 10:1).

After the kings of Israel moved, first to Tirzah and later on to Samaria, Shechem lost its importance, and we do not hear of it until after the fall of Jerusalem (587 BC). The events connected with the restoration were to bring it again into prominence. When, on his second visit to Jerusalem, Nehemiah expelled the grandson of the high priest Eliashib (probably the Manasse of Josephus, Antiquities, XI, vii, viii) and with him the many Jews, priests and laymen, who sided with the rebel, these betook themselves to Shechem; a schismatic temple was then erected on Mount Garizim and thus Shechem became the "holy city" of the Samaritans. The latter, who were left unmolested while the orthodox Jews were chafing under the heavy hand of Antiochus IV (Antiquities, XII, v, 5, see also Antinomianism in the Books of the Maccabees) and welcomed with open arms every renegade who came to them from Jerusalem (Antiq., XI, viii, 7), fell about 128 BC before John Hyrcanus, and their temple was destroyed (Antiquities, XIII, ix, 1).

New Testament
Shechem is mentioned in The Book of Acts.

It is not known whether the Samaritan city of Sychar (Sykhar) in the Gospel of John ( refers to Shechem or to another nearby village: "So he came to a Samaritan city called Sychar, near the plot of ground that Jacob had given to his son Joseph."

 mentions one of the women of Sychar going to Jacob's Well. Based on John 4:15, these scholars have argued that Shechem is the Samaritan city of Sychar described in the Gospel of John.

Some of the inhabitants of Sychar were "Samaritans" who believed in Jesus when he tarried two days in the neighborhood. Sychar and/or Shechem city must have been visited by the Apostles on their way from Samaria to Jerusalem.(

Distinguish from
Sichem is an old spelling for Zichem, a Flemish municipality which was named after the biblical Sichem; it is now merged into Scherpenheuvel-Zichem.
Sekem is an anthroposophical and Islamic foundation and farming village centered on principles for biodynamic agriculture in Egypt; this name refers to Shechem, and to the Ancient Egyptian hieroglyph pronounced 'Sekem' meaning 'vitality' or 'life'.

See also
 Biblical archaeology
 Kingdom of Israel

References

Sources
 Cornel Heinsdorff: "Christus, Nikodemus und die Samaritanerin am Jakobsbrunnen", Berlin/New York 2003, 218–220,

External links

 Full archaeological and biblical discussion of Shechem
 Guide to the Jewish Communities around Shechem
 Jewish Encyclopedia: Shechem

Archaeological sites in the West Bank
Hebrew Bible cities
Torah cities
Canaanite cities
Levitical cities
Tribe of Ephraim
Habiru
Razed cities
Former populated places in the State of Palestine
Nablus
Kingdom of Israel (Samaria)
Ancient Samaritan settlements